Georgios Christakis-Zografos (1863–1920) was a Greek politician, minister of foreign affairs and president of the Autonomous Republic of Northern Epirus (1914).

Life

Studies and early career
He was the son of the entrepreneur and benefactor Christakis Zografos, from Qestorat, (Lunxhëri) in the Gjirokastër prefecture. Christakis-Zografos studied in Paris and in Munich law and political science. When he returned in Greece, he was involved in agricultural reforms especially according to the large fields his father possessed in Thessaly. During this period he supported the concept that the large feudal estates (called cifliks during the period) of the region should be expropriated and redistributed to those who owned no land. He sold to non-land owners much of his agricultural fields in extremely low prices.

1905–1913
In 1905, he was elected to the Greek Parliament for the Karditsa prefecture. In 1909, he served as Foreign Minister under Dimitrios Rallis. After the First Balkan War, he was appointed Governor General of newly liberated from the Greek Army Epirus region. Christakis-Zografos served as Governor General of Epirus from March 29 (March 16 OS), 1913 until December 31 (December 18 OS) of the same year.

Head of the Provisional Government of Northern Epirus

When the Great Powers decided to award Northern Epirus to Albania, local Greeks formed a provisional government under Christakis-Zografos on February 28, 1914 and declared their autonomy the following day in Gjirokastër. Zografos sent a note to each of the representatives of the Great Powers explaining the eminent situation:
Under these conditions and in the absence of a solution that would suffice to safeguard Epirus, a solution would have been otherwise so easy to discover, the Epirote populace is forced to declare to the Powers that it cannot submit to their decision. It will declare its independence and will struggle for its existence, its traditions and its rights. But, before it executes this last decision, Epirus turns for the last time to face its judges and pleads with them to modify their decision by which a whole people is condemned.This people hopes that the Powers will be pleased to make known to it, the sole interested party, their final decision May Christian and civilized Europe, by this decision, escape the heavy responsibility for the horror of a ruthless struggle.
After a three months period of armed conflicts, the European Powers intervened and asked for negotiations on a new basis. On May 17 the state of Northern Epirus was internationally recognized by the Protocol of Corfu, as an autonomous region inside the borders of Albania. However, this state was short lived and on October 27, when World War I broke out and the Albanian government collapsed, the Greek army re-entered the area with the sanction of the Great Powers.

1914–1920
Christakis-Zografos after the second Greek administration in the area, returned to Greece and was elected at the following elections. He resigned his office at December 1914. A little while later he became executive of the National Bank of Greece, position he retained until September 1917, with a short-term interval (February 25-August 10, 1915) when he became for second time Minister of Foreign Affairs under the cabinet of Dimitrios Gounaris. He supported the entrance Greece on the side of the Triple Entente during World War I, foreseeing that this strategic move could offer to the country several advantages. He retired in 1917 and died three years later from a longtime heart ailment.

Legacy
During the Communist regime in Albania (1945–1992), Georgios Christakis-Zografos and his father Christakis Zografos (notable benefactor and entrepreneur), were stigmatised as 'enemies of the state'. Anyone from his home town who held the name 'Zografos' (whether relatives or not), was therefore persecuted. After 1992 however, the situation has changed. Today, the Zografeio school in Qestorati, founded by his father, has been renovated and has reopened as a museum.

References

Sources

1863 births
1920 deaths
Politicians from Paris
Greek MPs 1905–1906
Foreign ministers of Greece
Northern Epirus independence activists